Bǎi Wàn Zhì Duō Xīng (for a translation see below) was a Chinese game show, hosted by Lǐ Fán. It was based on the original British format of Who Wants to Be a Millionaire?. The contestant's main goal was to win 1,000,000 Chinese yuan by answering 15 multiple-choice questions correctly. This edition used the original 3 lifelines: Fifty Fifty, Phone A Friend and Ask The Audience. The first episode was broadcast on 29 September 2007. After answering five questions correctly, a contestant took home ¥5,000. If he/she answered ten questions correctly, he/she left with ¥75,000. Due to the strict limit that Chinese game shows cannot offer prizes more than ¥100,000, contestants may only take 10% of their winnings, while the rest are donated for chosen charities. The episodes were shown on Saturdays at 20:40 (UTC+8) on Chinese TV station GuiZhou TV. The final episodes ran until April 2008, where the channel had adjustment issues.

The series was produced in Guangzhou.

Characteristics of the Chinese version 
The Mainland China version differs from all other versions of the show for the fact that it doesn't feature civil contestants taking home the money won during the game, but celebrities playing for money which is given to charity. This is because the Chinese Government issued a decree that television programmes need to be uplifting and inspiring.

Translation of the name 
The name of the show cannot be translated literally.

Money tree

References 

Who Wants to Be a Millionaire?
Chinese television shows
2007 Chinese television series debuts
2008 Chinese television series endings